Davi Ramos (born November 5, 1986) is a Brazilian professional mixed martial artist and Brazilian jiu jitsu practitioner who competes in the Lightweight division of Absolute Championship Akhmat (ACA). A professional since 2010, he most notably competed in the Ultimate Fighting Championship.

Mixed martial arts career

Early career
Ramos made his professional MMA debut in July 2010. Over the next six years, he amassed a record of 6 wins against 1 defeat.

Ultimate Fighting Championship
Ramos made his UFC debut in March 2017 as a replacement for Max Griffin against Sérgio Moraes at UFC Fight Night: Belfort vs. Gastelum. He lost the fight via unanimous decision.

In his second fight for the promotion, Ramos faced Chris Gruetzemacher on December 9, 2017 at UFC Fight Night: Swanson vs. Ortega. He won the fight via rear-naked choke submission in the third round.

For his third fight with the promotion, Ramos faced Nick Hein on May 12, 2018 at UFC 224. He won the fight via rear-naked choke submission in the first round.

Ramos faced John Gunther on November 10, 2018 at UFC Fight Night 139. He won the fight via a rear-naked choke in round one.

Ramos faced promotional newcomer Austin Hubbard on May 18, 2019 at UFC Fight Night 152. He won the fight via unanimous decision.

Ramos faced Islam Makhachev on September 7, 2019 at UFC 242. He lost the fight via unanimous decision.

Ramos was expected to face Arman Tsarukyan on April 11, 2020 at UFC Fight Night: Overeem vs. Harris. Due to the COVID-19 pandemic, the event was eventually postponed . The bout eventually moved to UFC Fight Night 172 on July 19, 2020. He lost the fight via unanimous decision.

After two years off not being offered a new contract and not having any bouts booked, Ramos requested and was granted a release from the UFC.

Absolute Championship Akhmat 
After his release, Ramos signed with ACA, announcing that he would compete in the ACA Lightweight Grand Prix, with his first bout being against Artem Reznikov at ACA 140 on June 17, 2022. He lost the bout via unanimous decision.

Professional grappling career
Ramos competed against Pedro Marinho at F2W 177 on July 16, 2021, losing the match by unanimous decision. He returned to the promotion at F2W 182 on August 29, 2021 to face Dante Leon in the main event, although he lost this match as well.

Ramos was booked to challenge Craig Jones for the Polaris middleweight title in the main event of Polaris 17 on October 9, 2021. Ramos lost this match by decision, and Jones won the vacant title. Ramos then competed at the inaugural UFC FightPass Invitational event on December 16, 2021, where he represented Team LFA alongside Ary Farias, Gregory Rodrigues, and Rafael Lovato Jr. Ramos drew both his matches against Anton Berzin and Daniel Pineda, and his team won the tournament.

As a result of him being a former champion, Ramos was then invited to compete in the 77kg division of the 2022 ADCC World Championship on September 17-18, 2022. He was forced to withdraw from the event due to visa issues just a days before, and was replaced by Mateusz Szczecinski.

Mixed martial arts record

|-
|
|align=center|
|Mukhamed Kokov
|
|ACA 149
|
|align=center|
|align=center|
|Moscow, Russia
|
|-
|Loss
|align=center|10–5
|Artem Reznikov
|Decision (unanimous)
|ACA 140
|
|align=center|5
|align=center|5:00
|Sochi, Russia
|
|-
|Loss
|align=center|10–4
|Arman Tsarukyan
|Decision (unanimous)
|UFC Fight Night: Figueiredo vs. Benavidez 2 
|
|align=center|3
|align=center|5:00
|Abu Dhabi, United Arab Emirates
|
|-
|Loss
|align=center|10–3
|Islam Makhachev
|Decision (unanimous)
|UFC 242 
|
|align=center|3
|align=center|5:00
|Abu Dhabi, United Arab Emirates
|
|-
|Win
|align=center|10–2
|Austin Hubbard
|Decision (unanimous)
|UFC Fight Night: dos Anjos vs. Lee 
|
|align=center|3
|align=center|5:00
|Rochester, New York, United States
|
|-
| Win
|align=center| 9–2
|John Gunther
|Submission (rear-naked choke)
|UFC Fight Night: Korean Zombie vs. Rodríguez 
|
|align=center| 1
|align=center| 1:57
|Denver, Colorado, United States
|
|-
| Win
|align=center| 8–2
|Nick Hein
|Submission (rear-naked choke)
|UFC 224
|
|align=center| 1
|align=center| 4:15
|Rio de Janeiro, Brazil
|
|-
| Win
| align=center| 7–2
| Chris Gruetzemacher
| Submission (rear-naked choke)
| UFC Fight Night: Swanson vs. Ortega
| 
| align=center| 3
| align=center| 0:50
| Fresno, California, United States
| 
|-
| Loss
| align=center| 6–2
| Sérgio Moraes
| Decision (unanimous)
| UFC Fight Night: Belfort vs. Gastelum
| 
| align=center| 3
| align=center| 5:00
| Fortaleza, Brazil
|
|-
| Win
| align=center| 6–1
| Nick Piedmont
| Decision (unanimous)
| Phoenix FC 1
| 
| align=center| 3
| align=center| 5:00
| Zouk Mikael, Lebanon
|
|-
| Win
| align=center| 5–1
| Mike Flach
| Submission (rear-naked choke)
| RFA 42: Giagos vs. Estrazulas
| 
| align=center| 1
| align=center| 4:07
| Visalia, California, United States
|
|-
|  Loss
| align=center| 4–1
| David Rickels
| Decision (unanimous)
| Bellator 130
| 
| align=center| 3
| align=center| 5:00
| Mulvane, Kansas, United States
|
|-
| Win
| align=center| 4–0
| Claudiere Freitas
| Submission (armbar)
| Talent MMA Circuit 8
| 
| align=center| 1
| align=center| 3:07
| Valinhos, Brazil
| 
|-
| Win
| align=center| 3–0
| José Alberto Quiñónez
| TKO (punches)
| EFA: Mexico vs. Brazil
| 
| align=center| N/A
| align=center| N/A
| Tuxtla Gutiérrez, Mexico
| 
|-
|  Win
| align=center| 2–0
| Rony Silva
| Submission (guillotine choke)
| Nitrix Champion Fight 16
| 
| align=center| 1
| align=center| 1:03
| Americana, Brazil
| 
|-
| Win
| align=center| 1–0
| Juan Manuel Puig
| Submission
| CXC: Battle at the Beach
| 
| align=center| 1
| align=center| 0:36
| Cabo San Lucas, Mexico
|

References

External links
 
 

Brazilian male mixed martial artists
Lightweight mixed martial artists
Mixed martial artists utilizing Brazilian jiu-jitsu
Sportspeople from Rio de Janeiro (city)
Living people
1986 births
Ultimate Fighting Championship male fighters
Brazilian practitioners of Brazilian jiu-jitsu
People awarded a black belt in Brazilian jiu-jitsu